Liolaemus casamiquelai is a species of lizard in the family  Liolaemidae. The species is endemic to Argentina.

Etymology
The specific name, casamiquelai, is in honor of Argentine paleontologist Rodolfo Magín Casamiquela.

Geographic range
L. casamiqeulai is found in Río Negro Province, Argentina.

Habitat

References

Further reading
Avila LJ, Martinez LE, Morando M (2013). "Checklist of lizards and amphisbaenians of Argentina: an update". Zootaxa 3613 (3): 201–238.
Avila LJ, Perez CHF, Morando M, Sites JW Jr (2010). "A new species of Liolaemus (Reptilia: Squamata) from southwestern Rio Negro province, northern Patagonia, Argentina". Zootaxa 2434: 47–59. (Liolaemus casamiquelai, new species).

casamiquelai
Reptiles described in 2010
Reptiles of Argentina
Taxa named by Luciano Javier Ávila
Taxa named by Mariana Morando
Taxa named by Jack W. Sites Jr.